Samuel Snow (21 April 1880 – 8 September 1931) was a cricketer. He played in thirteen first-class matches for the British Guiana and Jamaican cricket team from 1901 to 1911.

References

External links
 

1880 births
1931 deaths
Cricketers from British Guiana
Jamaica cricketers